Johann(es) Petreius (Hans Peterlein, Petrejus, Petri; c. 1497, in Langendorf near Bad Kissingen – 18 March 1550, in Nuremberg) was a German printer in Nuremberg.

Life
He studied at the University of Basel, receiving the Master of Arts in 1517. Two years later, he worked as a proofreader for his relative Adam Petri. He became a citizen of Nuremberg in 1523, where he began working as a printer by at least 1524, though his name is only officially entered into the records in 1526. After his death the company was run by Gabriel Hayn.

Work
About 800 publications by him are known, including works in theology, science, law and the classics. He also printed music, using Pierre Attaingnant's single-impression technique. Though the amount of music was small, it was distinguished by its high quality.

His most famous work is the original edition of Nicolaus Copernicus's De Revolutionibus Orbium Coelestium in 1543, after an initiative of Georg Joachim Rheticus and Tiedemann Giese.

The inclusion of a foreword anonymously written by the Lutheran philosopher Andreas Osiander, stating that the whole work is only a simple hypothesis and intended to facilitate computation, which contradicts the content of Copernicus' work, is a rather controversial feature of the edition by Petreius. Petreius had sent a copy to Hieronymus Schreiber, an astronomer from Nuremberg who died in 1547 in Paris, but left a note in the book about the authorship of Osiander. Via Michael Mästlin, the book came to Johannes Kepler, who uncovered Osiander's deed.

Bibliography
 Georg Rithaymer: De orbis terrarum situa compendium. Johann Petreius, Nürnberg, 1538 
 Michael Stifel, Arithmetica Integra. Johann Petreius, Nürnberg, 1544
 Nicolaus Copernicus, De Revolutionibus Orbium Coelestium, Libri VI, Nuremberg, Johann Petreius, 1543 
 Girolamo Cardano, Artis Magnae sive de Regulis Algebraicis Liber I, Nuremberg, Johann Petreius, 1545
 Girolamo Cardano, De subtilitate rerum. Libri XXI. Nuremberg, Johann Petreius, 1550

Notes

External links
 
 Petreius' ornaments A-F
 https://web.archive.org/web/20060526023248/http://www.nzz.ch/2005/08/06/li/articleCZUON.html
 https://web.archive.org/web/20081023135412/http://www.ta-dip.de/56,0,petrejus-johannes-,index,0.html
 https://web.archive.org/web/20050212034755/http://langendorf.net/buch.htm
 From the Lessing J. Rosenwald Collection at the Library of Congress
Bible. N.T. Epistles. Italian. 1495. Epistole [et] Euangelii [et] Lectioni vulgari in lingua toschana. Florence, Lorenzo Morgiani and Johannes Petri, for Piero Pacini, 27 July 1495.
 Storia di Ottinello e Giulia.Storia di Ottinello e Giulia. [Florence, Lorenzo Morgiani and Johannes Petri, ca. 1500]

1497 births
1550 deaths
German printers
Businesspeople from Nuremberg